Second Men's League of Serbia, previously Basketball League of Serbia B, is the second-tier level men's professional basketball league in Serbia. Founded in 2006, it is run by the Basketball Federation of Serbia (KSS).

Rules

Competition format
The league, operated by the Basketball Federation of Serbia, has 14 teams. From the 2012–13 season, the top two teams in Second League goes to First League of Serbia. The teams positioned 11th, 12th, 13th and 14th in Second will be relegated to the 3td tier – First Men's Regional League.

Arena standards
Currently, clubs must have home arenas with capacity of minimum 500 seats.

History
The two first teams are promoted to the Basketball League of Serbia.

Current clubs

Statistical leaders
Source: eurobasket.com

Points

Rebounds

Assists

See also 
 YUBA B League (1991–2006)
 1st B Federal Basketball League (1980–1992)

References

External links
 Official website

 
Serbia B
SerbiaGre
2006 establishments in Serbia
Professional sports leagues in Serbia